Vyacheslav Ivanovich Dolgov, born 31 July 1937, is a Soviet and Russian diplomat and professor.

After graduating from the Moscow State Institute of International Relations in 1961, Dolgov entered the diplomatic corps of the Soviet Ministry of Foreign Affairs. From 1982-1984 he was an Adviser-Envoy at the Soviet Embassy in London.

His first ambassadorial appointment came on 22 August 1990 when he was appointed as Ambassador of the Soviet Union to Australia, with concurrent accreditation to Fiji, Nauru and Vanuatu. After the dissolution of the Soviet Union, Dolgov continued as Russian ambassador to Australia.

From 1994 to 1997 he was Ambassador of Russia to Kazakhstan, and 1997 to 1999 he was Director of the First Department for the CIS Countries in the Russian Ministry of Foreign Affairs.

From 1999 to 2002 he was posted to Minsk as Ambassador of Russia to Belarus, and from 2002 to the end of 2004 he was posted to Ljubljana as Ambassador of Russia to Slovenia.

Since September 2005, Dolgov has been lecturing in consular law at his alma mater.

References

1937 births
Living people
Ambassador Extraordinary and Plenipotentiary (Soviet Union)
Ambassadors of the Soviet Union to Australia
Ambassadors of the Soviet Union to Fiji
Ambassadors of the Soviet Union to Nauru
Ambassadors of the Soviet Union to Vanuatu
Ambassadors of Russia to Australia
Ambassadors of Russia to Fiji
Ambassadors of Russia to Nauru
Ambassadors of Russia to Vanuatu
Ambassadors of Russia to Kazakhstan
Ambassadors of Russia to Belarus
Ambassadors of Russia to Slovenia
Moscow State Institute of International Relations alumni